The Tangmere Military Aviation Museum is a museum located on the former site of RAF Tangmere, West Sussex. The museum was opened in June 1982. Many aerospace exhibits covering the First World War to the Cold War are on display including fixed-wing aircraft, helicopters and aircraft engines.

Aircraft on display
The museum aircraft are housed in two hangars with a small number on display externally. Several exhibits are on loan from the Royal Air Force Museum including the Hawker Hunter used by Neville Duke to break the airspeed record in 1953.

Piston engine aircraft

 Hawker Hurricane – replica
 Supermarine Spitfire K5054 – replica
 Westland Lysander – replica

Jet aircraft

 de Havilland Sea Vixen FAW.2 XJ580
 de Havilland Vampire T.11 XH313
 English Electric Lightning F.53 ZF578
 Gloster Meteor F.4 EE549
 Gloster Meteor F.8 WA829/WA984
 Hawker Hunter F.3 WB188
 Hawker Hunter F.5 WP190
 Hawker Siddeley Harrier GR.3 XV744
 McDonnell Douglas Phantom FGR.2 XV408
 Supermarine Swift FR.5 WK281

Aircraft cockpits

 de Havilland Canada Chipmunk T.10 WZ876
 English Electric Canberra B.2 WE113
 Hawker Hunter F.4 WV332
 Percival Provost T.1 XF840
 Royal Aircraft Factory S.E.5A – replica
 Supermarine Spitfire IX – under construction

Helicopters
 Westland Wessex HU.5 XS511

Simulators

 Air Combat Simulator
 English Electric Lightning
 Red Simulators

Aircraft engines

Piston engines
 Rolls-Royce Griffon

Gas turbine engines

 Rolls-Royce Derwent
 Rolls-Royce Nene
 Rolls-Royce Palouste

See also
List of aerospace museums

References
Notes

Bibliography
 Ellis, Ken. Wrecks and Relics - 19th Edition, Midland Publishing, Hinckley, Leicestershire. 2004.

External links

Tangmere Military Aviation Museum

Military aviation museums in England
Museums in West Sussex